Marine Fighter Attack Squadron 351 (VMFA-351) was a fighter squadron in the Marine Forces Reserve. The squadron was based at Naval Air Station Atlanta and participated in action during World War II and was decommissioned in 1975.

History

World War II
The squadron was originally activated as Marine Observation Squadron 351 (VMO-351) on March 1, 1943 at Marine Corps Air Station Cherry Point, North Carolina.  The squadron was moved to Bogue Field in May 1944 and was assigned to Marine Aircraft Group 51 (MAG-51).  They trained to take part in Operation Crossbow - Project Danny which was a plan to have carrier based Marine squadrons attack German V-1 Rocket sites.  This plan was cancelled and in September 1944 the squadron moved to Marine Corps Air Station Mojave.

During this time they were redesignated VMO(CVS)-351. During its combat tour the squadron provided aerial cover for minesweeping activity and bomber strikes in the East China Sea area. Because aerial combat was a rarity during the later stages of the war the squadron was only credited with downing three enemy aircraft in aerial combat. They were deactivated upon their return to the United States on November 9, 1945.

Reserve duty
The squadron was quickly reactivated as part of the Marine Air Reserve on July 1, 1946 and were based out of Naval Air Station Atlanta, Georgia. During the Korean War the squadron was reduced to paper strength as its pilots and groundcrew were transferred to other units to bring them up to strength.  The squadron was able to resume operation in July 1951 after receiving new personnel.

VMF-351 was redesignated Marine Attack Squadron 351 (VMA-351) in 1958 after they were re-equipped with the AD-4 Skyraider.  This lasted until 1962 when they transitioned aircraft to the FJ-4 Fury and once again became VMF-351.

In 1965 they transitioned from the FJ Fury to the F-8 Crusader.  They shared their aircraft with Naval Reserve squadrons VF-672 and VF-673.  When the Naval Air Reserve was reorganized in 1970, they became an independent squadron.  As part of the draw down of US troop levels following the Vietnam War, the squadron was deactivated on May 22, 1976.  They were reactivated in 1977, transitioned to the F-4 Phantom and were redesignated VMFA-351 however were quickly decommissioned the next year.

See also

 United States Marine Corps Aviation
 List of active United States Marine Corps aircraft squadrons
 List of decommissioned United States Marine Corps aircraft squadrons

Notes

References
Bibliography

 

Web

 Marine Gunfighters
 Naval Air War in the Pacific
 Gator cruise book

Fighter attack squadrons of the United States Marine Corps
Inactive units of the United States Marine Corps